Kostiantin Fedorovych Dankevych (December 24, 1905February 26, 1984) was a Soviet and Ukrainian composer, conductor, pianist and teacher. He was awarded the  People's Artist of the USSR in 1954.

Biography 
Kostiantyn Dankevych was born in Odessa, in the Russian Empire (in present-day Ukraine). He studied at the Odessa Conservatory with Vasily Zolotarev and Mykola Vilinsky and graduated in 1929. His friendship and collaboration with Vilinsky lasted many years. He was made the director of Songs and Dance of the Red Army Choir in Tbilisi. Konstantin wrote his first symphony in 1937. Two years later he wrote his most popular score, the ballet Lileya.

Dankevych taught composition at the Odessa Conservatory starting from 1944. In 1953, he was promoted to the staff of the Kyiv Conservatory. Dankevich used many Ukrainian and Russian Folk motifs. One of his notable works was his opera Bohdan Khmelnytsky (premiered January 29, 1951). Following its June premiere in Moscow, Pravda issued some vague and insignificant criticisms of the work, namely that it had not sufficiently portrayed the Polish gentry as enemies, that it did not depict the suffering of the masses, and it lacked a battle scene. The Ukrainian authorities took this criticism much further, attacking the libretto for “insufficiently glorifying the historical Russian-Ukraine friendship.” After several rounds of revisions, the opera was staged on September 27, 1953, to rave reviews, and was similarly well received when performed again in Moscow in May 1954.

When teaching he often wore two pairs of socks due to his superstitions.

In 1960, he wrote the opera Nazar Stodolya. Other works include Poem of Ukraine, several overtures and patriotic courses. In 1959, a monograph was published on him in Kyiv.

Kostiantyn Dankevych died on February 26, 1984, in Kyiv, in the Ukrainian SSR of the Soviet Union (in present-day Ukraine).

References

External links
entry from Ukrainian musician directory

1905 births
1984 deaths
20th-century classical composers
20th-century conductors (music)
20th-century male musicians
20th-century pianists
20th-century Ukrainian musicians
Musicians from Odesa
Academic staff of Kyiv Conservatory
Fourth convocation members of the Verkhovna Rada of the Ukrainian Soviet Socialist Republic
Fifth convocation members of the Verkhovna Rada of the Ukrainian Soviet Socialist Republic
Sixth convocation members of the Verkhovna Rada of the Ukrainian Soviet Socialist Republic
People's Artists of the USSR
Recipients of the Order of Lenin
Recipients of the Order of the Red Banner of Labour
Recipients of the title of People's Artists of Ukraine
Recipients of the Shevchenko National Prize
Operetta composers
Soviet classical musicians
Soviet conductors (music)
Soviet film score composers
Soviet male classical composers
Soviet music educators
Soviet opera composers
Soviet pianists
Ukrainian classical composers
Ukrainian classical musicians
Ukrainian conductors (music)
Ukrainian film score composers
Ukrainian music educators
Ukrainian opera composers

Ukrainian pianists
Burials at Baikove Cemetery